The Aberdeenshire Amateur Football Association (AAFA) is the governing body for amateur football in the City of Aberdeen and County of Aberdeenshire in North East Scotland. They run the Aberdeenshire Amateur Football League and associated cup competitions. The association was founded in 1947 and is affiliated to the Scottish Amateur Football Association.

Member clubs

As of season 2019-20, the AAFA have sixty-six member clubs.

Premier Division

Bervie Caledonian
Cove Thistle
Cowie Thistle
Echt
Insch
MS United
Newburgh Thistle

Newtonhill
Old Aberdonians
Rattrays XI
St Laurence
Tarves
Woodside

Division One (North)

Banchory Amateurs
Bridge of Don
Continental
Ellon Amateurs
Faithlie United
Great Western United
JS XI

Kemnay Amateurs
Kintore
Nicolls Amateurs
Stonehaven Athletic
Stoneywood East End
Torphins
Turriff Thistle

Division One (East)

AC Mill Inn
Alford Amateurs
Bucksburn Thistle
Cammachmore
Colony Park
Dyce ITC Hydraulics
Ellon Thistle
FC Polska

Halliburton
Kaimhill United
Kincorth
St Marnans
Tolbooth
University
Westdyke

Division Two (North)

Auchnagatt Barons
BSFC
Glendale
Glendale Youth
Glentanar Reflex
Grammar FP's

Huntly Amateurs
Lads Club Amateurs
Monymusk
Postal ALC
Theologians
West End United

Division Two (East)

Aboyne
Beacon Rangers
Blackburn
Burghmuir
Ferryhill
Feughside

Jesus House
Kemnay Youth
Middlefield Wasps
Newmachar United
University Colts
University Strollers

League Structure

The Aberdeenshire AFA is split into three single tiers - a Premier Division at the summit with two divisions below. Divisions One and Two are split into two parallel groups. 

The league setup:

Associated competitions

Aberdeen F.C. Trophy
The equivalent of the League Cup, a knock-out competition for all member clubs.

1947-48 Cove Rangers
1948-49 Cove Rangers
1949-50 Cove Rangers
1950-51 Ellon United
1951-52 Cove Rangers
1952-53 Cove Rangers
1953-54 Cove Rangers
1954-55 Banchory
1955-56 Cove Rangers
1956-57 Cleansing Department
1957-58 Cove Rangers
1958-59 Cove Rangers
1959-60 Banchory
1960-61 Bon Accord
1961-62 Cove Rangers
1962-63 Cove Rangers
1963-64 Ellon United
1964-65 Cove Rangers
1965-66 Ellon United
1966-67 Aberdeen University
1967-68 Aberdeen City Police
1968-69 A.D. Club
1969-70 Aboyne
1970-71 Maud
1971-72 Culter
1972-73 Maud
1973-74 Culter
1974-75 Cove Rangers
1975-76 Culter
1976-77 Culter
1977-78 Kemnay
1978-79 Longside
1979-80 Chattan Rovers
1980-81 Denmore Thistle
1981-82 Aboyne
1982-83 Cove Rangers
1983-84 Cove Rangers
1984-85 Cove Rangers
1985-86 Culter
1986-87 Culter
1987-88 Longside
1988-89 Kincorth
1989-90 Kincorth
1990-91 Hermes
1991-92 Kincorth
1992-93 Kincorth
1993-94 Hilton
1994-95 Dyce
1995-96 Echt
1996-97 Hilton
1997-98 Echt
1998-99 Echt
1999-00 Echt
2000-01 Cowie Thistle
2001-02 Echt
2002-03 Walker Road
2003-04 Kincorth
2004-05 Sunnybank Amateurs
2005-06 Echt
2006-07 Stoneywood SSC
2007-08 Echt
2008-09 University
2009-10 Bon-Accord City
2010-11 Woodside
2011-12 Woodside
2012-13 Sportsmans Club
2013-14 Cove Thistle
2014-15 Rothie Rovers
2015-16 Ellon Amateurs
2016-17 Cove Thistle
2017-18 Cowie Thistle

Edmond Trophy
A consolation cup for losing teams in the first round of the Aberdeen F.C. Trophy.

1954-55 Fittie Rangers
1955-56 Millbank
1956-57 Rowatt
1957-58 Rowatt
1958-59 CWD Athletic
1959-60 No Competition
1960-61 No Competition
1961-62 No Competition
1962-63 No Competition
1963-64 Mugiemoss Sports
1964-65 Lads Club
1965-66 Kintore
1966-67 Kemnay
1967-68 Newtonhill
1968-69 College of Education
1969-70 Richard's XI
1970-71 Hall Russell United
1971-72 Marley United
1972-73 Stonehaven
1973-74 Stoneywood Amateurs
1974-75 Grampian Spurs
1975-76 Banchory St. Ternan
1976-77 Seaview Spurs
1977-78 Seaview Spurs
1978-79 Seaview Spurs
1979-80 Alford
1980-81 Denmore Thistle
1981-82 Carlton
1982-83 Postal
1983-84 Kintore
1984-85 No Competition
1985-86 No Competition
1986-87 Potterton
1987-88 Kincorth
1988-89 Portlethen Thistle
1989-90 Blackburn
1990-91 Hilton
1991-92 Cruden Bay
1992-93 Royal Cornhill
1993-94 Old Aberdonians
1994-95 Gramar FPs
1995-96 Frigate
1996-97 Great Western United
1997-98 No Competition
1998-99 Grammar FPs
1999-00 West End
2000-01 Grampian Police
2001-02 Frigate
2002-03 Frigate
2003-04 Stoneywood SSC
2004-05 Frigate
2005-06 Kincorth Rovers
2006-07 Westdyke
2007-08 Bon-Accord City
2008-09 Cowie Thistle
2009-10 Cowie Thistle
2010-11 Kincorth
2011-12 Cove Thistle
2012-13 Woodside
2013-14 Cowie Thistle
2014-15 Westhill
2015-16 West End
2016-17 Tolbooth
2017-18 Newtonhill

Association Trophy
A knock-out competition for Premier Division and Division One clubs.

1989-90 Kincorth
1990-91 Glentanar
1991-92 Great Western United
1992-93 Raeden Thistle
1993-94 Kincorth
1994-95 Hatton
1995-96 Glentanar
1996-97 FC Hayloft
1997-98 Echt
1998-99 Luthermuir
1999-00 Cowie Thistle
2000-01 Hilton
2001-02 Echt
2002-03 Walker Road
2003-04 Aberdeen Sporting Club
2004-05 Stoneywood SSC
2005-06 Echt
2006-07 Stoneywood SSC
2007-08 Echt
2008-09 Cowie Thistle
2009-10 Echt
2010-11 Cove Thistle
2011-12 Cove Thistle
2012-13 Echt
2013-14 Cowie Thistle
2014-15 Cove Thistle
2015-16 Ellon Amateurs
2016-17 Torry Amateurs
2017-18 Woodside

Bowie Cup
A consolation cup for losing teams in the first round of the Association Trophy.

1949-50 Castlehill
1950-51 No Competition
1951-52 Banchory
1952-53 Mugiemoss FC
1953-54 Banchory
1954-55 No Competition
1955-56 Formartine United
1956-57 University
1957-58 Cove Rangers
1958-59 Avondale
1959-60 Formartine United
1960-61 Ellon United
1961-62 Cove Rangers
1962-63 Aboyne
1963-64 University
1964-65 Cove Rangers
1965-66 Cove Rangers
1966-67 Cove Rangers
1967-68 Dyce Amateurs
1968-69 No Competition
1969-70 College of Education
1970-71 Dyce Amateurs
1971-72 Bon Accord
1972-73 Cove Thistle
1973-74 Chattan Rovers
1974-75 Aboyne
1975-76 Newtonhill
1976-77 Banchory
1977-78 Maryculter
1978-79 Commercial Thistle
1979-80 Commercial Thistle
1980-81 Aboyne
1981-82 Grampian Police
1982-83 Shamrock
1983-84 Marley United
1984-85 No Competition
1985-86 No Competition
1986-87 Banchory St Ternan
1987-88 Banchory St Ternan
1988-89 Potterton
1989-90 Dyce Amateurs
1990-91 Rattray's XI
1991-92 Cults
1992-93 Hatton
1993-94 Dyce
1994-95 Hilton
1995-96 FC Hayloft
1996-97 Glendale
1997-98 Braemar
1998-99 Beacon Rangers
1999-00 Inverurie FP's
2000-01 Kemnay Youth
2001-02 Nicolls XI
2002-03 Sunnybank Amateurs
2003-04 Glendale
2004-05 Bridge of Don
2005-06 Glentanar Reflex
2006-07 Frigate
2007-08 Bon-Accord City
2008-09 Glendale XI
2009-10 Dyce
2010-11 Stoneywood Amateurs
2011-12 Westdyke
2012-13 Lads Club Amateurs
2013-14 Feughside
2014-15 Woodside
2015-16 Dee Amateurs
2016-17 Formartine United
2017-18 St Laurence

Premier Trophy
A knock-out competition for Premier Division clubs.

2001-02 Kincorth
2002-03 Kincorth
2003-04 University
2004-05 Wilsons Amateurs
2005-06 Stoneywood SSC
2006-07 Great Western United
2007-08 Echt
2008-09 Bon Accord City
2009-10 Westdyke
2010-11 Echt
2011-12 Cove Thistle
2012-13 Woodside
2013-14 Cove Thistle
2014-15 Sportsmans Club
2015-16 Woodside
2016-17 Sportsmans Club
2017-18 Cove Thistle
2018-19 Rothie Rovers

Stephen Shield
A knock-out competition for clubs in Division One (North).

1978-79 Tanfield Thistle
1979-80 Kemnay Youth
1980-81 Kingseat
1981-82 Kingseat
1982-83 Woodside
1983-84 Michelin
1984-85 Walker Road YC
1985-86 No Competition
1986-87 Phoenix
1987-88 Fintray Thistle
1988-89 AC Mill Inn
1989-90 Hilton
1990-91 Luthermuir
1991-92 Halliburton
1992-93 Ellon Thistle
1993-94 Blackthorn Short Mile
1994-95 University
1995-96 Echt
1996-97 Great Western United
1997-98 Great Western United
1998-99 West End
1999-00 Banchory
2000-01 Cowie Thistle
2001-02 Frigate
2002-03 Frigate
2003-04 Luthermuir
2004-05 Bridge of Don
2005-06 Glentanar Reflex
2006-07 Nicolls Amateurs
2007-08 Cowie Thistle
2008-09 Sportsmans Club
2009-10 Tarves
2010-11 Nicolls Amateurs
2011-12 Insch
2012-13 Dyce ITC Hydraulics
2013-14 Tarves
2014-15 Echt
2015-16 Bervie Caledonian
2016-17 Cove Thistle
2017-18 St Laurence

White Cup
A knock-out competition for clubs in Division One (East).

1973-74 Ellon Youth
1974-75 Maryculter
1975-76 Longside
1976-77 Farburn
1977-78 Seaview Spurs
1978-79 Castle Rovers
1979-80 Aboyne
1980-81 Cove Thistle
1981-82 Aberdeen Shamrock
1982-83 Oxy Sporting Club
1983-84 Kemnay Youth
1984-85 Postal
1985-86 No Competition
1986-87 RAF Buchan
1987-88 No Competition
1988-89 Newburgh Thistle
1989-90 Phoenix
1990-91 Blackburn
1991-92 Stonehaven White Heather
1992-93 Echt
1993-94 RGU
1994-95 BSFC
1995-96 Burghmuir
1996-97 Continental
1997-98 No Competition
1998-99 Theologians
1999-00 Fintray Thistle
2000-01 FC Byron Munich
2001-02 RGU
2002-03 University Strollers
2003-04 AC Mill Inn
2004-05 Dyce Amateurs
2005-06 Stoneywood Amateurs
2006-07 West End
2007-08 Lads Club Amateurs
2008-09 Old Aberdonians
2009-10 Woodside
2010-11 Cove Thistle
2011-12 Halliburton
2012-13 Old Aberdonians
2013-14 RGU
2014-15 Nicolls Amateurs
2015-16 Dee Amateurs
2016-17 Stoneywood East End
2017-18 Insch

Castle Rovers Cup
A knock-out competition for clubs in Division Two (North).

1978-79 Glentanar
1979-80 Turriff Amateurs
1980-81 Parkinson's
1981-82 Bieldside
1982-83 Chattan Rovers
1983-84 Feughside
1984-85 No Competition
1985-86 Beacon Rangers
1986-87 Donside
1987-88 No Competition
1988-89 FC Hayloft
1989-90 Cammachmore
1990-91 Trophies International
1991-92 Hilton
1992-93 Luthermuir
1993-94 Greentrees
1994-95 Old Aberdonians
1995-96 Sheddocksley
1996-97 Frigate
1997-98 Royal Cornhill
1998-99 Carlton
1999-00 Halliburton
2000-01 Auchnagatt Barons
2001-02 Maryculter
2002-03 Woodbank
2003-04 RGU
2004-05 No Winner
2005-06 Postal ALC
2006-07 Alford
2007-08 Stonehaven Athletic
2008-09 University Colts
2009-10 Hilton
2010-11 Postal ALC
2011-12 Ellon Thistle
2012-13 Northern United
2013-14 Granite City
2014-15 Westhill
2015-16 Newburgh Thistle
2016-17 Newburgh Thistle
2017-18 Turriff Thistle

Barclay Cook Cup
A knock-out competition for clubs in Division Two (East).

1964-65 Cove Rangers
1965-66 Cove Rangers
1966-67 Cove Thistle
1967-68 Kemnay
1968-69 No Competition
1969-70 Links Parks
1970-71 Grandholm
1971-72 Alford
1972-73 Ellon Youth
1973-74 Albion Rangers
1974-75 Longside
1975-76 Savings Bank
1976-77 Carlton
1977-78 Braemar
1978-79 G.S.A.
1979-80 Cup Withheld
1980-81 Kingseat
1981-82 Raeden Thistle
1982-83 Parkinson's
1983-84 McTeagle Taylor
1984-85 No Competition
1985-86 No Competition
1986-87 Rothie Rovers
1987-88 Feughside
1988-89 APG McTeagle
1989-90 FC Hayloft
1990-91 Riverside
1991-92 Echt
1992-93 RGU
1993-94 AC Mill Inn
1994-95 Theologians
1995-96 Theologians
1996-97 Cults
1997-98 No Competition
1998-99 Chattan Rovers
1999-00 Cults
2000-01 College of Education
2001-02 Newmachar United
2002-03 Newmachar United
2003-04 Newtonhill
2004-05 Postal ALC
2005-06 PA United
2006-07 Blackburn
2007-08 Turriff Thistle
2008-09 Luthermuir
2009-10 Mearns United
2010-11 Westhill
2011-12 Hazlehead United
2012-13 AC Mill Inn
2013-14 JS XI
2014-15 Bridge of Don
2015-16 Westdyce
2016-17 Sheddocksley
2017-18 Tolbooth
2018-19 Colony Park

Chattan Rovers Cup
A knock-out competition for clubs in Division Three.

1974-75 Kemnay
1975-76 Culter
1976-77 Culter
1977-78 Grampian Spurs
1978-79 Dyce Amateurs
1979-80 Grandholm Rosslyn
1980-81 Longside
1981-82 Culter
1982-83 Cove Rangers
1983-84 Cove Rangers
1984-85 Crombie Sports
1985-86 No Competition
1986-87 Kincorth
1987-88 Braemar
1988-89 FC Central
1989-90 Theologians
1990-91 Albion Rangers
1991-92 Grampian CD
1992-93 Hilton
1993-94 Echt
1994-95 Deep Freeze
1995-96 Deep Freeze
1996-97 Sheddocksley
1997-98 Albion Rangers
1998-99 Bankhead
1999-00 Alford
2000-01 Trophies International
2001-02 Torphins
2002-03 Torry United
2003-04 Millburn
2004-05 Inverurie FPs
2005-06 Kincorth Rovers
2006-07 Bankhead
2007-08 Kemnay Youth
2008-09 Hilton
2009-10 Portlethen United
2010-11 Torphins
2011-12 Great Northern Athletic
2012-13 Granite City
2013-14 Fintray Thistle
2014-15 Sheddocksley
2015-16 Monymusk
2016-17 Tolbooth
2017-18 St Marnans

Dickie Trophy
A knock-out competition for clubs in Divisions Two and Three.

1968-69 Aberdeen City Police
1969-70 Monymusk
1971-72 Culter
1972-73 Kemnay
1973-74 Kemnay
1974-75 Culter
1975-76 Culter
1976-77 Longside
1977-78 Newtonhill
1978-79 Longside
1979-80 Chattan Rovers
1980-81 Aberdeen Shamrock
1981-82 Grandholm Rosslyn
1982-83 Longside
1983-84 Shamrock
1984-85 Hall Russell United
1985-86 No Competition
1986-87 Walker Road
1987-88 Potterton
1988-89 West End
1989-90 Grampian Police
1990-91 Glentanar
1991-92 Glentanar
1992-93 Kincorth
1993-94 Hatton
1994-95 Dyce
1995-96 Cove Thistle
1996-97 Hilton
1997-98 Skene
1998-99 University
1999-00 Echt
2000-01 University
2001-02 Glentanar Reflex
2002-03 Woodbank
2003-04 Cove Thistle
2004-05 Ferryhill
2005-06 Bervie Caledonian
2006-07 Theologians
2007-08 Insch
2008-09 Hilton
2009-10 Rattrays XI
2010-11 Rothie Rovers
2011-12 Hazlehead United
2012-13 Granite City
2013-14 Bankhead
2014-15 Sheddocksley
2015-16 Ellon Thistle
2016-17 Bridge of Don
2017-18 Tolbooth

Hans Fyfe Trophy
A consolation cup for losing teams in the first round of the Dickie Trophy

1969-70 Kemnay
1970-71 Culter
1971-72 Kemnay
1972-73 Culter
1973-74 Cove Rangers
1974-75 Culter
1975-76 Culter
1976-77 Kemnay
1977-78 Chattan Rovers
1978-79 Newtonhill
1979-80 Chattan Rovers
1980-81 Culter
1981-82 Aberden Shamrock
1982-83 Cove Rangers
1983-84 Longside
1984-85 Crombie Sports
1985-86 No Competition
1986-87 Longside
1987-88 Longside
1988-89 Kemnay Youth
1989-90 University
1990-91 Tarves
1991-92 Alford
1992-93 Grampian CD
1993-94 Hilton
1994-95 Hayloft Pearsons
1995-96 Woodside
1996-97 Turriff Amateurs
1997-98 Trophies International
1998-99 Frigate
1999-00 Grampian Police
2000-01 Walker Road
2001-02 Quayside Rosebowl
2002-03 Turriff Thistle
2003-04 Johnshaven Athletic
2004-05 Theologians
2005-06 Alford
2006-07 Stonehaven Athletic
2007-08 Tarves
2008-09 Glendale
2009-10 Hilton
2010-11 Postal ALC
2011-12 St Laurence
2012-13 Glentanar Reflex
2013-14 Granite City
2014-15 Westhill
2015-16 Glendale XI
2016-17 Don Athletic
2017-18 St Marnans

Ian Napier Memorial Shield
A pre-season supercup contested between the previous season's Division One regional champions.

1980-81 Castle Rovers
1981-82 Cove Rangers
1982-83 No Competition
1983-84 No Competition
1984-85 Alford
1985-86 Kemnay Youth
1986-87 YMCA Rovers
1987-88 Turriff Amateurs
1988-89 Glendale
1989-90 Hermes
1990-91 Stoneywood Amateurs
1991-92 Inverurie FP's
1992-93 Queen's Cross Reflex
1993-94 University
1994-95 No Competition
1995-96 No Competition
1996-97 Woodside
1997-98 Blackburn
19*98-99 Sheddocksley
1999-00 Frigate
2000-01 Kingseat United
2001-02 No Competition
2002-03 Walker Road
2003-04 Aberdeen Sporting Club
2004-05 Luthermuir
2005-06 Mintlaw
2006-07 Burghmuir
2007-08 Nicolls Amateurs
2008-09 Banchory Amateurs
2009-10 Sportsmans Club
2010-11 Woodside
2011-12 Cove Thistle
2012-13 Luthermuir
2013-14 MS United
2014-15 RGU
2015-16 Torry Select
2016-17 AC Mill Inn
2017-18 Cove Thistle

John Todd Memorial Trophy
A pre-season supercup contested between the winner and runner-up in the previous season's Premier Division.

2009-10 Echt
2010-11 University
2011-12 University
2012-13 Woodside
2013-14 Sportsmans Club
2014-15 Sportsmans Club
2015-16 Woodside
2016-17 Woodside
2017-18 Sportsmans Club

Previous Cups and Shields

Cusiter Cup
1971-72 Alford
1972-73 Grampian Spurs
1973-74 Grampian Spurs
1974-75 Banchory St Ternan
1975-76 Longside
1976-77 Insch
1977-78 Carlton
1978-79 Powis FP's
1979-80 Kabell
1980-81 S.S. & S.C.
1981-82 Yule FC
1982-83 Balmoral Vics
1983-84 Michelin
1984-85 No Competition
1985-86 No Competition
1986-87 Kincorth
1987-88 Rothie Rovers
1988-89 Frigate
1989-90 Stoneywood Amateurs
1990-91 Stoneywood SSC
1991-92 Feughside
1992-93 Blackburn
1993-94 Woodside
1994-95 Echt
1995-96 Braemar
1996-97 Stoneywood Four Mile
1997-98 Sheddocksley
1998-99 Bridge of Don United
1999-00 Newtonhill
2000-01 Kintore

Millennium Cup
1999-00 Wilson's XI

Ewen Trophy
1972-73 Banchory
1973-74 Kemnay
1974-75 Cove Rangers
1975-76 Kemnay
1976-77 Glenavon S.C.
1977-78 Culter
1978-79 Dyce Amateurs
1979-80 Dyce Amateurs
1980-81 Culter
1981-82 Grandholm Rosslyn
1982-83 Longside
1983-84 Shamrock
1984-85 No Competition
1985-86 No Competition
1986-87 Mugiemoss
1987-88 Longside
1988-89 Grampian Police
1989-90 Raeden Thistle
1990-91 Cults
1991-92 Wilson's XI

AAFA Charity Cup
1989-90 Banchory St. Ternan
1990-91 Portlethen Thistle
1991-92 Blackthorn
1992-93 Glentanar

AAFA Fiftieth Anniversary Soccer World Cup
1997-98 Echt

Willie Gibb Memorial Trophy
1994-95 Glentanar
1995-96 No Competition
1996-97 Hilton

Paterson Cup
1967-68 Cove Rangers
1968-69 A.D. Club
1969-70 Port Thistle
1970-71 Newtonhill
1971-72 Chattan Rovers
1972-73 Marley United
1973-74 Marley United
1974-75 Stoneywood Amateurs
1975-76 Grampian Sports
1976-77 Cults
1977-78 Kintore
1978-79 Hermes
1979-80 Aboyne
1980-81 Aberdeen Shamrock
1981-82 Hermes
1982-83 Alford
1983-84 Kingseat
1984-85 No Competition
1985-86 No Competition
1986-87 Turriff Amateurs
1987-88 Beacon Rangers
1988-89 Walker Road
1989-90 Summerhill United
1990-91 Cowie Thistle
1991-92 FC Hayloft
1992-93 Scot/Douglas
1993-94 Cruden Bay
1994-95 RGU
1995-96 East End Amateurs
1996-97 AC Mill Inn
1997-98 Stonehaven White Heather
1998-99 AC Mill Inn
1999-00 Carlton
2000-01 College of Education

Norman McAvoy Memorial Trophy
1983-84 Banchory
1984-85 Hall Russell United
1985-86 Albion Rangers
1986-87 Ellon Thistle
1987-88 Ferryhill
1988-89 Kemnay Amateurs
1989-90 Walker Road
1990-91 Portlethen Thistle
1991-92 No Competition
1992-93 Wilson's XI
1993-94 Raeden Thistle
1994-95 Dyce
1995-96 No Competition
1996-97 Echt
1997-98 ALC Chattan
1998-99 Great Western United
1999-00 Sheddocksley
2000-01 Inverurie FPs

Neil Scott Memorial Trophy
1976 Culter
1977 Cove Rangers
1978 Culter
1979 Kemnay Amateurs
1980 Newtonhill
1981 Grandholm Rosslyn
1982 Cove Rangers
1983 Cove Rangers
1984 Cove Rangers
1985 Crombie Sports
1986 Longside
1987 Longside
1988 Kemnay Youth
1989 Grampian Police
1990 Great Western United

The P.J. Stuart Memorial Shield
1972-73 Ellon Youth XI
1973-74 Albion Rangers
1974-75 Longside
1975-76 Insch
1976-77 Carlton
1977-78 Denmore Thistle
1978-79 Kintore Youth
1979-80 Glentanar
1980-81 Kingseat
1981-82 Raeden Thistle
1982-83 Bieldside
1983-84 Chattan Rovers
1984-85 Huntly Amateurs

Trophies International Cup
1989-90 Banchory St. Ternan
1990-91 Banchory St. Ternan
1991-92 Kincorth
1992-93 Hermes
1993-94 Great Western United
1994-95 Skene Bieldside
1995-96 Dyce Amateurs
1996-97 Kemnay Youth
1997-98 Hilton
1998-99 Hilton
1999-00 Hilton
2000-01 Sheddocksley

Champions

Premier Division
2001-02 Echt
2002-03 Kincorth
2003-04 Kincorth
2004-05 Sunnybank Amateurs
2005-06 Sunnybank Amateurs
2006-07 Echt
2007-08 Echt
2008-09 Cove Thistle
2009-10 Bon-Accord City
2010-11 Kincorth
2011-12 Woodside
2012-13 Sportsmans Club
2013-14 Sportsmans Club
2014-15 Cove Thistle
2015-16 RGU
2016-17 Woodside
2017-18 Woodside

Division One (North)
2001-02 Walker Road
2002-03 Sunnybank Amateurs
2003-04 Luthermuir
2004-05 Mintlaw
2005-06 Burghmuir
2006-07 Nicolls Amateurs
2007-08 Kincorth
2008-09 Sportsmans Club
2009-10 Beacon Rangers
2010-11 Mearns United
2011-12 Insch
2012-13 MS United
2013-14 Rothie Rovers
2014-15 Echt
2015-16 Westhill
2016-17 Cove Thistle
2017-18 Stoneywood East End

Division One (East)
2001-02 Cowie Thistle
2002-03 RGU
2003-04 Burghmuir
2004-05 Cove Thistle
2005-06 Beacon Rangers
2006-07 West End
2007-08 Banchory Amateurs
2008-09 Old Aberdonians
2009-10 Woodside
2010-11 Cove Thistle
2011-12 Luthermuir
2012-13 Beacon Rangers
2013-14 RGU
2014-15 Torry Select
2015-16 AC Mill Inn
2016-17 Cowie Thistle
2017-18 Insch

Division Two (North)
2001-02 Glentanar Reflex
2002-03 MS United
2003-04 RGU
2004-05 Feughside
2005-06 Bucksburn United
2006-07 Bridge of Don
2007-08 Stonehaven Athletic
2008-09 Bucksburn United
2009-10 Lads Club Amateurs
2010-11 Don Athletic
2011-12 Bervie Caledonian
2012-13 Dee Amateurs
2013-14 Granite City
2014-15 Westhill
2015-16 Bon Accord City
2016-17 Newburgh Thistle
2017-18 Turriff Thistle

Division Two (East)
2001-02 Huntly Amateurs
2002-03 Blackburn
2003-04 University Strollers
2004-05 Newtonhill
2005-06 Bervie Caledonian
2006-07 Lads Club Amateurs
2007-08 Glendale XI
2008-09 Glendale
2009-10 Ellon Amateurs
2010-11 Rothie Rovers
2011-12 Hazlehead United
2012-13 AC Mill Inn
2013-14 Grammar FP's
2014-15 Formartine United
2015-16 Rattrays XI
2016-17 Bridge of Don
2017-18 Tolbooth
2018-19 Colony Park

Previous League Winners

Division Two (South)
2001-02 Stoneywood Four Mile
2002-03 Mintlaw
2003-04 Bridge of Don
2004-05 Inverurie FPs

Division Three
2005-06 Kincorth Rovers
2006-07 Trophies International
2007-08 Kemnay Youth
2008-09 Hilton
2009-10 Portlethen United
2010-11 JS XI
2011-12 Dee Amateurs
2012-13 Granite City
2013-14 BSFC
2014-15 Sheddocksley
2015-16 Balmedie
2016-17 Faithlie United

Division One
1947-48 Cove Rangers
1948-49 Cove Rangers
1949-50 Ellon United
1950-51 Ellon United
1951-52 Millburn FC
1952-53 Millburn FC
1953-54 Cove Rangers
1954-55 Cove Rangers
1955-56 Cove Rangers
1956-57 Cove Rangers
1957-58 Cove Rangers
1958-59 Nicoll's XI
1959-60 Cove Rangers
1960-61 Cove Rangers
1961-62 Ellon United
1962-63 Ellon United
1963-64 Bon Accord FC
1964-65 Cove Rangers
1965-66 Aboyne
1966-67 Aberdeen City Police
1967-68 Aberdeen City Police
1968-69 Aberdeen City Police
1969-70 Aberdeen City Police
1970-71 Maud
1971-72 Kemnay
1972-73 Culter
1973-74 Culter
1974-75 Culter
1975-76 Culter
1976-77 Cove Rangers
1977-78 Kemnay
1978-79 Culter
1979-80 Culter
1980-81 Culter
1981-82 Grandholm Rosslyn
1982-83 Cove Rangers
1983-84 Aberdeen Shamrock
1984-85 Cove Rangers
1985-86 Crombie Sports
1986-87 Mugiemoss Amateurs
1987-88 Longside
1988-89 Hall Russell United
1989-90 Great Western United
1990-91 Kincorth
1991-92 Kincorth
1992-93 Kincorth
1993-94 Kincorth
1994-95 Dyce
1995-96 Hilton
1996-97 Echt
1997-98 Hilton
1998-99 Hilton
1999-00 Hilton
2000-01 Echt

Division Two
1952-53 No records
1953-54 Rattray's XI
1954-55 No records
1955-56 No records
1956-57 Nicoll's XI
1957-58 Kingseat
1958-59 Avondale
1959-60 Dyce Amateurs
1960-61 Bon Accord
1961-62 CWD Department
1962-63 Castle Rovers
1963-64 Culter
1964-65 Lads Club
1965-66 Orion
1966-67 Millburn
1967-68 Kemnay
1968-69 Maud
1969-70 Waterton Thistle
1970-71 Cove Thistle
1971-72 Newtonhill
1972-73 Banchory
1973-74 Chattan Rovers
1974-75 Aboyne
1975-76 Newtonhill
1976-77 University
1977-78 Albion Rangers
1978-79 Cornhill Thistle
1979-80 Longside
1980-81 Aboyne
1981-82 Blackthorn
1982-83 Shamrock
1983-84 Castle Rovers
1984-85 Hall Russell United
1985-86 Kemnay Youth
1986-87 Windsor
1987-88 Aboyne
1988-89 Glentanar
1989-90 Kincorth
1990-91 Portlethen Thistle
1991-92 Chattan Rovers
1992-93 Raeden Thistle
1993-94 Dyce
1994-95 Hilton
1995-96 Echt
1996-97 Cowie Thistle
1997-98 Glentanar
1998-99 Sheddocksley
1999-00 Frigate
2000-01 Nicoll's XI

Division Three
1952-53 Rattray's XI
1953-54 No records
1954-55 No records
1955-56 Nicoll's XI
1956-57 Cove Thistle
1957-58 Mackie Academy
1958-59 CWD Athletic
1959-60 No Competition
1960-61 No Competition
1961-62 No Competition
1962-63 No Competition
1963-64 No Competition
1964-65 No Competition
1965-66 No Competition
1966-67 Kemnay
1967-68 Newtonhill
1968-69 Queen's Cross
1969-70 Portlethen Thistle
1970-71 Inverurie FP's
1971-72 Strichen United
1972-73 Richard's XI
1973-74 Glenavon SC
1974-75 Stoneywood Amateurs
1975-76 Grampian Spurs
1976-77 Cults
1977-78 Inverurie FP's
1978-79 Longside
1979-80 Seaview Spurs
1980-81 Cove Thistle
1981-82 Aberdeen Shamrock
1982-83 Hatton
1983-84 Kingseat
1984-85 Kemnay Youth
1985-86 Windsor
1986-87 Queen's Cross
1987-88 Potterton
1988-89 Kincorth
1989-90 Portlethen Thistle
1990-91 Tarves
1991-92 Stoneywood SSC
1992-93 Huntly Amateurs
1993-94 Hilton
1994-95 Echt
1995-96 Braemar
1996-97 Banchory
1997-98 Sheddocksley
1998-99 Frigate
1999-00 Potterton
2000-01 Walker Road

Division Four
1969-70 Strichen United
1970-71 Chattan Rovers
1971-72 Wiggins Teape
1972-73 Alford
1973-74 Stoneywood Amateurs
1974-75 Ellon Thistle
1975-76 Cults
1976-77 Torphins
1977-78 Hermes
1978-79 Castle Rovers
1979-80 Newmachar
1980-81 Denmore Thistle
1981-82 S.S. & S.C.
1982-83 Yule FC
1983-84 Ferryhill
1984-85 Oxy Sporting Club
1985-86 Beacon Rangers
1986-87 Ashley Park
1987-88 Kincorth
1988-89 Portlethen Thistle
1989-90 Feughside
1990-91 Oxy S.C.
1991-92 FC Hayloft
1992-93 Hilton
1993-94 Echt
1994-95 RGU
1995-96 Turriff Amateurs
1996-97 Sheddocksley
1997-98 Frigate
1998-99 Cults
1999-00 Grammar FP's
2000-01 Carlton

Division Five
1971-72 Alford
1972-73 Central Dynamos
1973-74 Grampian Spurs
1974-75 Albion Rangers
1975-76 Longside
1976-77 Insch
1977-78 Trophy Centre
1978-79 Grampian CD
1979-80 Auchmill
1980-81 S.S. & S.C.
1981-82 Kingseat
1982-83 Ferryhill
1983-84 Michelin
1984-85 Chattan Rovers
1985-86 Potterton
1986-87 Kincorth
1987-88 Rothie Rovers
1988-89 Feughside
1989-90 Cowie Thistle
1990-91 Trophies International
1991-92 Hilton
1992-93 Cruden Bay
1993-94 RGU
1994-95 Bridge of Don
1995-96 Sheddocksley
1996-97 Frigate
1997-98 Royal Cornhill
1998-99 Carlton
1999-00 Halliburton
2000-01 Postal ALC

Division Six
1972-73 Ellon Youth
1973-74 Albion Rangers
1974-75 Longside
1975-76 Insch
1976-77 Carlton
1977-78 Denmore Thistle
1978-79 Kintore Youth
1979-80 Glentanar
1980-81 Kingseat
1981-82 Raeden Thistle
1982-83 Bieldside
1983-84 Chattan Rovers
1984-85 Huntly Amateurs
1985-86 Kincorth
1986-87 Rothie Rovers
1987-88 RAF Buchan
1988-89 FC Central
1989-90 Newmachar United
1990-91 Hilton
1991-92 Cruden Bay
1992-93 RGU
1993-94 AC Mill Inn
1994-95 Burghmuir
1995-96 Frigate

Division Seven
1978-79 Glentanar
1979-80 YMCA Rovers
1980-81 Ferryhill
1981-82 College of Education
1982-83 Chattan Rovers
1983-84 Walker Road
1984-85 Kincorth
1985-86 Rothie Rovers
1986-87 Bucksburn Thistle
1987-88 Phoenix
1988-89 Meldrum United
1989-90 Hilton
1990-91 Luthermuir
1991-92 Aboyne

Division Eight
1986-87 Meldrum United
1987-88 Newmachar United
1988-89 Newburgh Thistle

Notes

References

External links

Football leagues in Scotland
Football in Aberdeen
Football in Aberdeenshire
1947 establishments in Scotland
Sports organizations established in 1947
Amateur association football in Scotland